Last Of The Old Romantics is the second full-length album released by Magic Eight Ball.

Background 
Writing for "Last Of The Old Romantics" began while Magic Eight Ball's debut album "Sorry We're Late But We're Worth The Wait" was being recorded. Frontman Baz Francis and producer Dave Draper had established a working relationship during the creation of their first album. This encouraged the band to go back into the studio only three months after the first album was released to start working on their sophomore effort. Songs were already written, but deliberately left off 'Sorry We're Late…' as they felt the songs would fit better on their next release. Baz Francis believed the new material written at that point seemed like love letters from relationships past and present. He expanded upon that theme and chose to make the whole album just that; a journal of his romantic endeavors, both flawed and joyous. The idea of the album title, and the artwork concept stemmed from a heated argument over animal rights in which he loved the romance of the hunter becoming the hunted.

After former Enuff Z'Nuff front man Donnie Vie performed on the first record, the band felt they should continue to aim high when it came to the musical guest on their follow up. Bassist Robbie J. Holland and Baz compiled a list of possible contributors to 'Last Of The Old Romantics'.

Track listing

Personnel

Musicians 
 Baz Francis – Vocals, guitars, bass & keys
 Jason Bowld – Drums

Additional performers 
 Rik Mayall – Introductions to tracks 1 & 6, Closing outro on track 10. 
 Dave Draper – Additional outro guitar on ‘Losing My Faith In Human Nature’
 Hugh Thomas – Saxophone on ‘What Happened In ’92’ Rik Mayall: Very Special Master of Ceremonies
 Hugh Thomas – Additional brass arrangement on ‘What Happened In ’92’
 Jason Bowld – Additional backing vocal arrangement on ‘California In The Fall’

Production 
 Dave Draper – Mixing & Mastering
 Dave Draper and Baz Francis – Programming
 Dave Draper and Baz Francis – Production

Art direction 
 Kay Dougan – Live band photography
 Baz Francis – Original design concept
 Tariq Hussain – Artwork layout
 Stuart Anderson – Studio photo
 Kay Dougan – All illustrations
 Dave Draper – Photo editing

References

External links

2014 albums
Magic Eight Ball albums